This is a list of Bollywood films that were released in 2015.

The highest-grossing Bollywood film of 2015 was Bajrangi Bhaijaan, which was the second-highest-grossing Bollywood film ever at the time.

Box office collection

January–March

April–June

July–September

October–December

See also
 List of Bollywood films of 2016
 List of Bollywood films of 2014

Notes

References

2015
Bollywood
Bollywood